Campanula lasiocarpa, also known as the mountain harebell or Alaska harebell, is a plant native to the northwestern portion of North America including the US states of Alaska and Washington, as well as the Canadian provinces of Alberta, British Columbia, the Northwest Territories, and the Yukon.

Description
It is a member of the genus Campanula, commonly known as bellflowers. The blossoms of these flowers taste like a mixture of dandelion stems and the way honeysuckle smells, but no other purple flowers growing in the Yukon Territory should be consumed as most others range from somewhat poisonous to grotesquely perilous if eaten.

References

External links

lasiocarpa
Plants described in 1829